The 1994–95 Segunda División was the 46th season of the Mexican Segunda División and the first season as the third level of the mexican football leagues system.
The season started on 3 September 1994 and concluded on 24 June 1995. It was won by Cruz Azul Hidalgo.

Teams

Group stage

Group 1

Group 2

Group 3

Group 4

Results

Repechage

Final stage

Promotion final
To determine the winning team of the promotion to Primera División 'A', a playoff was held between Bachilleres, the best team of the regular season, and Cruz Azul Hidalgo, winner of the season final play-offs. Cruz Azul Hidalgo won the series and with it was promoted to the second level of Mexican football.

First leg

Second leg

References 

1994–95 in Mexican football
Segunda División de México seasons